Stroyan is a surname. Notable people with the surname include:
John Stroyan (born 1955), Scottish-born Anglican bishop
John Stroyan (politician) (1856–1941), Scottish industrialist and politician
Keith Stroyan, American mathematician
Johanna Ropner (born Johanna Stroyan, 1963), British businesswoman